The 16-inch coastal defense gun M1895 was a large artillery piece installed to defend major American seaports. Only one was built and it was installed  in Fort Grant on the Pacific side of the Panama Canal Zone. It was operated by the United States Army Coast Artillery Corps.

History

Under President Grover Cleveland's administration in 1885, the Board of Fortifications under William C. Endicott was ordered to investigate the value and state of the United States' coastal defenses. Endicott found that America had fallen behind and that new naval technology made many forts and coastal defense weaponry obsolete. The 1886 report recommended a $127-million ($ in ) construction program of breech-loading cannons, mortars, floating batteries, and submarine mines for some 29 locations on the US coastline. New fortifications built in the following decades as a result of this report were called "Endicott Period" fortifications.

Finding a need for long range weaponry, the United States Army Coast Artillery Corps ordered a 16-inch (406 mm) gun, the construction of which began in 1895 at the Watervliet Arsenal in Watervliet, New York. The massive artillery piece was designated the M1895 and was completed in 1902; only one was built. At  it weighed more than any gun that had ever been created up to that point.

The weapon was shipped from the Watervliet Arsenal to Watertown Arsenal in Watertown, Massachusetts to be packed for shipment to the Panama Canal Zone.  It was installed on an M1912 disappearing carriage in Fort Grant on the Pacific side of the canal in 1915, where it protected the fort until it was scrapped in 1943. The muzzle section was later preserved and displayed at the Watervliet Arsenal museum, which closed in 2013.

Gallery

See also
List of U.S. Army weapons by supply catalog designation
List of the largest cannon by caliber
Seacoast defense in the United States
12-inch Gun M1895
16"/50 caliber M1919 gun
Coast Artillery fire control system

Bibliography 
Notes

References 

 

 Description of Seacoast Guns 8, 10, 12, 14, 16-inch

External links
 
FortWiki gun type list

World War I artillery of the United States
World War I guns
World War II artillery of the United States
Coastal artillery
400 mm artillery
Disappearing guns